Giorgi Melia (born 14 September 1996) is a Georgian wrestler. He competed in the 2020 Summer Olympics.

Melia won gold at the 2016 World Junior Wrestling Championships in the 96 kg weight division and at the Grand Prix de France Henri Deglane 2021 in the 97 kg weight division.

He competed in the 97kg event at the 2022 World Wrestling Championships held in Belgrade, Serbia.

References

External links
 

1996 births
Living people
Wrestlers at the 2020 Summer Olympics
Male sport wrestlers from Georgia (country)
Olympic wrestlers of Georgia (country)
20th-century people from Georgia (country)
21st-century people from Georgia (country)